Ruth João (born 17 October 1998) is an Angolan handball player for SCM Craiova and the Angolan national team.

She represented Angola at the 2019 World Women's Handball Championship.

References

1998 births
Living people
Angolan female handball players